South Union Street Historic District may refer to:

South Union Street Courthouse and Commercial Historic District (Concord, North Carolina), listed on the NRHP in North Carolina
 South Union Street Historic District (Concord, North Carolina), listed on the NRHP in North Carolina
 South Union Street Historic District (Burlington, Vermont), listed on the NRHP in Vermont